Gnathonemus is a genus of elephantfish in the family Mormyridae.

Species 
There are currently four recognized species in this genus:

 Gnathonemus barbatus Poll 1967 (Angolan mormyrid)
 Gnathonemus echidnorhynchus Pellegrin 1924 (Blunt-jawed elephantnose)
 Gnathonemus longibarbis (Hilgendorf 1888) (Longnose stonebasher)
 Gnathonemus petersii (Günther 1862) (Peters's elephantnose fish)

References 

Mormyridae
Ray-finned fish genera
Taxa named by Theodore Gill 
Taxonomy articles created by Polbot